Notoncus is an Australian genus of ants in the subfamily Formicinae. The genus is known from Australia (one species is also known from Papua New Guinea), where the ants nest in the soil or on the ground under stones and logs in forested areas. The ants are also common in gardens and parks.

Species
The genus includes the following six species:

 Notoncus capitatus Forel, 1915
 Notoncus ectatommoides (Forel, 1892)
 Notoncus enormis Szabo, 1910
 Notoncus gilberti Forel, 1895
 Notoncus hickmani Clark, 1930
 Notoncus spinisquamis (Andre, 1896)

References

Formicinae
Ant genera
Hymenoptera of Australia